Route 100 (also known as The Cape Shore Highway and Argentia Access Road) is a major highway in Newfoundland and Labrador.  The highway begins at its northern terminus at the Trans-Canada Highway (Route 1) in the town of Whitbourne, runs for  until it ends at its southern terminus, the town of Branch, where it transitions into Route 92.  Motorists can drive along the coast of Placentia Bay and eventually the Atlantic Ocean once traveling south of Point Verde.

The route's most important community is the town of Placentia, which is home to the province's only lift bridge.

Route 100 also serves as an access to the Marine Atlantic ferry to Nova Scotia, which is located in Argentia.  The ferry only operates during the summer months.

Route description

Route 100 begins as The Cape Shore Highway at an intersection between Route 92 and Loop Road in downtown Branch and it heads west through neighbourhoods to leave town and pass through rural areas, where the highway has intersections with local roads leading to Point Lance, Cape St. Mary's, and Cape St. Mary's Ecological Reserve. Route 100 now turns northward along the coastline as it passes through St. Bride's, Cuslett (where it crosses over a river), Angels Cove, and Patrick's Cove (where it crosses a small brook). The highway now becomes very winding as it passes through Gooseberry Cove and Gooseberry Cove Provincial Park, Ship Cove, Great Baraway, and Point Verde. Route 100 now enters the town of Placentia and immediately meets Route 91 in Southeast Placentia. It turns north and passes through the actual community of Placentia before crossing a lift bridge into Jerseyside. The highway now has an intersection with a local road leading to the Castle Hill National Historic Site before passing through Freshwater. Route 100 now meets a road leading to Argentia and the Nova Scotia ferry before turning eastward and more inland as Argentia Access Road. It now bypasses through Ferndale on its north side before passing through Dunville, where it has an intersection with Route 102. The highway leaves the town limits and heads northeast along a river valley to have an intersection with Route 101 before passing by Fitzgerald's Pond Park. Route 100 now has an intersection with a local road leading to Placentia Junction before passing through rural areas for several kilometres to enter Whitbourne and Route 100 comes to an end shortly thereafter at an intersection with Route 1 (Trans-Canada Highway).

Major intersections

Attractions along Route 100

Marine Atlantic Ferry to Nova Scotia in Argentia
Castle Hill National Historic Site
Fitzgerald's Pond Park
Gooseberry Cove Provincial Park
Cape St. Mary's Ecological Reserve

References

100